Round Grove is an unincorporated community in Lawrence County, in the U.S. state of Missouri.

History
A post office called Round Grove was established in 1871, and remained in operation until 1907. The community was named for a round grove near the original town site.

References

Unincorporated communities in Lawrence County, Missouri
Unincorporated communities in Missouri